Gyneth Markley "Gy" Waldron (born August 5, 1932) is an American screenwriter and director best known as the writer/director of the movie Moonrunners, and creator of the television series, The Dukes of Hazzard.

Life and career
Born in Lenoxburg, Kentucky (about 60 km [35 miles] southeast of Cincinnati, Ohio), Waldron developed characters from his first film into the hit television series for CBS. He also wrote episodes for One Day at a Time as well as several TV movies.

References

External links

1932 births
American television producers
American screenwriters
American television writers
American male television writers
The Dukes of Hazzard
Living people
People from Bracken County, Kentucky
Film directors from Kentucky